The Country Schoolmaster or Country Schoolmaster Uwe Karsten is a 1933 German drama film directed by Carl Heinz Wolff and starring Hans Schlenck, Marianne Hoppe and Heinrich Heilinger. It was remade in 1954.

The film's art direction was by Otto Hunte and Willy Schiller.

Cast
 Hans Schlenck as Uwe Karsten Alslew, der Dorfschulmeister
 Marianne Hoppe as Ursula Diewen
 Heinrich Heilinger as Heinrich Heinsius
 Brigitte Horney as Martha Detlefsen
 Olga Tschechowa as Teresa van der Straaten
 Walter Steinbeck as Ernst Diewen, Handelsherr
 Carl Auen as Pastor Sunneby
 Günther Ballier as Klaus Sundewitt, Hilfslehrer
 Jeanette Bethge as Frau Anslew, Uwe Karstens Mutter
 Eberhard Leithoff as Ludwig Diewen, der Sohn
 Ernst Behmer as Krüger, ein Winkelbankier
 Paul Henckels as Professor Sieveking
 Maria Karsten as Frau Sundewitt
 Paul Moleska as Ein Bauer
 Ernst Hieber
 Wolfgang Lohmeyer
 Petra Unkel
 Walter Vollmann

References

Bibliography

External links 
 

1933 films
1933 drama films
German drama films
Films of the Weimar Republic
Films of Nazi Germany
1930s German-language films
Films directed by Carl Heinz Wolff
UFA GmbH films
Films based on German novels
German black-and-white films
Films scored by Ludwig Schmidseder
1930s German films